Sergio Elio Ángel Fortunato (born 23 October 1956) is an Argentine former footballer. He was capped by the Argentina national team in 1979.

Career statistics

International

References

1956 births
Living people
Argentine footballers
Argentine expatriate footballers
Argentina youth international footballers
Argentina international footballers
Association football forwards
Kimberley de Mar del Plata footballers
Aldosivi footballers
Racing Club de Avellaneda footballers
Quilmes Atlético Club footballers
Estudiantes de La Plata footballers
A.C. Perugia Calcio players
UD Las Palmas players
Favoritner AC players
La Liga players
Serie A players
Austrian Football Bundesliga players
Argentine expatriate sportspeople in Italy
Expatriate footballers in Italy
Argentine expatriate sportspeople in Spain
Expatriate footballers in Spain
Argentine expatriate sportspeople in Austria
Expatriate footballers in Austria
Sportspeople from Mar del Plata
Pan American Games bronze medalists for Argentina
Pan American Games medalists in football
Medalists at the 1975 Pan American Games
Footballers at the 1975 Pan American Games